Bunny Lake Is Missing is a 1965 British-American psychological mystery thriller film, directed and produced by Otto Preminger. Filmed in black-and-white widescreen format in London, it was based on the 1957 novel Bunny Lake Is Missing by Merriam Modell. It
stars Carol Lynley as a mother searching for her missing daughter, Keir Dullea as her brother, and Laurence Olivier as the police officer investigating the case. The score is by Paul Glass and the opening theme is often heard as a refrain. The rock band the Zombies also appear in the film, in a television broadcast.

Though initially received with indifference from critics and undersold by Preminger himself, Bunny Lake Is Missing has since been reappraised, particularly for its technical merits.

Plot
American single mother Ann Lake, who recently moved to London from New York, arrives at the Little People's Garden pre-school to collect her daughter, Bunny. The child has mysteriously disappeared. An administrator recalls meeting Ann but claims never to have seen the missing child. Ann and her brother Steven search the school and find a peculiar old woman living upstairs, who claims she collects children's nightmares. In desperation, the Lakes call the police and Superintendent Newhouse arrives on the scene. Everyone becomes a suspect and Superintendent Newhouse is steadfast, diligently following every lead. The police and Newhouse decide to visit the Lakes' new residence.

They conclude that all of Bunny's possessions have been removed from the Lakes' new home. Ann cannot understand why anyone would do this and reacts emotionally. Superintendent Newhouse begins to suspect that Bunny Lake does not exist, after he learns that "Bunny" was the name of Ann's imaginary childhood friend. Ann's landlord, an aging actor, attempts to seduce her. Newhouse decides to become better acquainted with Ann to learn more about Bunny. He takes her to a local pub where he plies her with brandy and soda.

On her return home, Ann discovers she still has the claim ticket for Bunny's doll, which was taken to a doll hospital for repairs. Regarding the doll as proof of Bunny's existence, she frantically rushes to the doll hospital late at night and retrieves the doll. Steven arrives later and when Ann shows him the doll, Steven burns the doll, hoping to destroy it, then knocks Ann unconscious. He takes Ann to a hospital and tells the desk nurse that Ann has been hallucinating about a missing girl who does not exist. Ann is put under observation with instructions for her to be sedated if she awakes.

Ann wakes up in the hospital and escapes. She discovers that Steven is burying Bunny's possessions in the garden, and had sedated the little girl, hiding her in the trunk of his car. Steven implies an incestuous interest with his sister, complaining that Bunny has always come between them. Believing that Ann loves Bunny more than him, the child threatens Steven's dream of a future with his sister. Ann, realising her brother is insane, begins playing childhood games with Steven, in order to distract him from killing little Bunny. Newhouse, having discovered that Steven lied to the police about the name of the ship that brought the Lakes to England, rushes quickly to the Lakes' residence, arriving in time to apprehend Steven, successfully rescuing Ann and Bunny.

Cast

In addition, Bunny Lake is played by Suky Appleby.

Production details
The 1965 Sunbeam Tiger sports car (registration EDU 296C) featured in this film still exists as a classic car, and sold at auction for £35,840 (2015).

Filming
Adapting the original novel, Preminger moved the story from New York to London, where he liked working. His dark, sinister vision of London made use of many real locations: the Barry Elder Doll Museum in Hammersmith stood in for the dolls' hospital; the Little People's Garden School used school buildings in Hampstead; and the "Frogmore End" house was one that had belonged to novelist Daphne du Maurier's father Sir Gerald du Maurier. Preminger had found the novel's denouement lacking in credibility, so he changed the identity of the would-be murderer. This prompted many rewrites from his British husband-and-wife scriptwriters John Mortimer and Penelope Mortimer before Preminger was satisfied.

Music
English rock band the Zombies are featured in the credits and on the film's poster for their contribution of three songs to the film's soundtrack: "Remember You", "Just Out of Reach" and "Nothing's Changed". The band is featured performing on a television in the pub where Superintendent Newhouse meets with Ann, and "Just Out of Reach" plays on a janitor's radio as Ann escapes from the hospital.  With Preminger present in the studio, the band recorded a two-minute radio ad set to the tune of "Just Out of Reach" that promoted the film's release and urged audiences to "Come on time!" in keeping with the film's no-late-admissions policy. These efforts represent an early instance of what became the common Hollywood practice of promotional tie-ins with popular musical acts.

Release
As with the 1960 film Psycho, audiences were not admitted after the film's start. This was not common practice at the time and was emphasised in the film's promotion, including on the poster, which warned: "No One Admitted While the Clock Is Ticking!"

Home media
The film was released on DVD in 2005 (Region 1) and 2007 (Region 2). In 2014, Twilight Time released a limited Blu-ray edition.

In popular culture
The film was spoofed in Mad magazine, in the April 1966 issue (#102), under the title "Bubby Lake Missed by a Mile".
In the Better Call Saul episode "Off Brand", Chuck McGill walks past a movie theatre playing Bunny Lake is Missing.

References

External links

 
 
 
 

1965 films
1960s mystery thriller films
1960s psychological thriller films
British black-and-white films
British mystery thriller films
British psychological thriller films
Columbia Pictures films
Films about missing people
Films based on American novels
Films based on mystery novels
Films directed by Otto Preminger
Films set in London
Films shot in London
1960s English-language films
1960s British films